Doris Fleeson (May 20, 1901 – August 1, 1970) was an American journalist and columnist and was the first woman in the United States to have a nationally syndicated political column.

Early life 
Fleeson was born in Sterling, Kansas, to clothing store manager, William Fleeson, and Helen Fleeson (née Tebbe). She was the youngest of six children. In 1918, she graduated from Sterling High School, where she was the class valedictorian.

In 1918, Fleeson attended Sterling College, then known as Cooper College, for an academic year. Fleeson went on to attend and receive a B.A. in Economics from the University of Kansas in 1923.

Career

Early career 
Fleeson's first journalism job was at the Pittsburg Sun. She moved to Evanston, Illinois, to become the society editor of the News-Index and then to Long Island, New York to be an editor at Great Neck News. In 1927, she joined the New York Daily News as a general assignment reporter, eventually moving to the newspaper's Albany bureau to cover state politics.

Washington career 
Fleeson and her husband, fellow Daily News reporter John O'Donnell, moved to Washington D.C. to work on at Daily News' Washington Bureau in 1930. They started a column together called "Capital Stuff" in 1933 that was published until their divorce in 1942. She left the Daily News in 1943 to be a war correspondent for Woman's Home Companion. She reported from France and Italy during the war before returning to Washington to write a political column for the Boston Globe and Washington Evening Star. In 1945, the column was picked up by the Bell Syndicate and distributed across the country. At its height in 1960, her column ran in about 100 newspapers.

Honors and memberships 
 1957: Fleeson received an honorary degree (Doctor of Humane Letters, honoris causa) from The Sage Colleges, the former Russell Sage College.
 1954: Raymond Clapper award, the American Society of Newspaper Editors
 New York Paperwoman's Club for Distinguished Reporting
 Member, Women's National Press Club

Personal life 
In 1930, Fleeson married New York Daily News colleague, John O'Donnell, with whom she had a daughter, Doris O'Donnell. The marriage ended in divorce in 1942.

In 1958, Fleeson married Dan A. Kimball, who had been Secretary of the Navy from 1951–53, and later was President of Aerojet. Eleanor Roosevelt attended the wedding, as did financier Bernard Baruch.

In 1970, Fleeson died of complications from a stroke.

References

Further reading 
 Reminiscences of Doris Fleeson Kimball : oral history, 1966. Adlai E. Stevenson project. Columbia University. Rare Book, Butler 6th Fl. East (Non-Circulating) NXCP89-A380. 1966. 
 Davis, Kenneth S. Personal Papers of Doris Fleeson, 1912-1970. Doris Fleeson Collection, University Archives, PP 186. Kenneth Spencer Research Library, University of Kansas Libraries. 2010. 

1901 births
1970 deaths
American columnists
University of Kansas alumni
People from Sterling, Kansas
20th-century American non-fiction writers
20th-century American women writers
American women columnists